Kwan Doo Village is a village located at Lamaing,  Mon State, Myanmar (Burma). Most of people are Mon people.

Notes
() means Bamboo mount village.

Village
Villages in Myanmar